The 2011 CAA men's soccer tournament, known as the 2011 Virginia 529 CAA Men's Soccer Championship for sponsorship reasons, was the 29th edition of the CAA Men's Soccer Tournament, which determines the conference's automatic berth into the 2011 NCAA Division I Men's Soccer Championship. Played from November 10–13, 2011 at James Madison University's Soccer Complex, the University of Delaware Fighting Blue Hens defeated the Old Dominion University Monarchs to their first ever CAA Men's Soccer Tournament since joining the conference. For Delaware, the title clinched their third ever berth into the tournament, and their first since 1970.

The tournament was hosted by the James Madison Dukes, as they won the regular season championship.

Qualification 

For the second straight season, six teams from the twelve team group qualified into the CAA Tournament. Though the Virginia Commonwealth University Rams and Georgia State University Panthers were tied for the final tournament berth, the Panthers edged the Rams in the first tiebreaker, head-to-head record.

Bracket

Schedule 

The higher seed, as well as the home team, is listed on the right.

Play-in round

Semifinals

CAA Championship

Statistics

Top goalscorers

See also 
 Colonial Athletic Association
 2011 Colonial Athletic Association men's soccer season
 2011 in American soccer
 2011 NCAA Division I Men's Soccer Championship
 2011 NCAA Division I men's soccer season

References

External links
CAA Men's Soccer Championship

-
CAA Men's Soccer Tournament
CAA Men's Soccer Tournament
CAA Men's Soccer Tournament